Willie Drye (born October 22, 1949) is an American journalist and an author. He has won awards for his writing about the science of hurricanes and their social and financial impacts. He has published three nonfiction books, and is a contributing editor for National Geographic News. His work has appeared in The Washington Post, The Globe and Mail of Toronto, and other national and regional publications. He is a frequent guest on radio talk shows in WLRN in Miami, WUNC in Chapel Hill, and other stations. His first book, Storm of the Century: The Labor Day Hurricane of 1935 and his work for National Geographic News have been cited in scientific studies of hurricanes and their effects on society, legal briefs, local emergency management plans, science teachers’ and public libraries’ suggested reading lists about hurricanes, books and other publications.

Personal life 

Drye was born in Albemarle, North Carolina, and grew up in nearby Misenheimer, a small college town near Charlotte. His father, Claude Dry, ran a small grocery store and gas station adjacent to the campus of Pfeiffer University. Drye spells his name differently than his family because of a mistake on his birth certificate. His first experience with a hurricane was October 1954, when he went with his family to Long Beach, North Carolina, to help relatives whose home had been destroyed by Hurricane Hazel. 

He credits Davida Gates, his sixth-grade teacher at Richfield School, with sparking his interest in historical research and storytelling. He was a standout athlete, earning five athletic letters at North Stanly High School, where he won a local award for sports writing for the student newspaper in 1967. He also was a volunteer firefighter for the Richfield-Misenheimer Volunteer Fire Department before graduating from North Stanly in 1968.

Drye attended Mitchell College (now Mitchell Community College) in Statesville, North Carolina and played a season of baseball there before entering the US Army, where he served as a medic. After receiving an honorable discharge, he attended Belmont Abbey College in Belmont, North Carolina for one semester to earn credits needed for admission to the University of North Carolina at Chapel Hill. The late Reverend Matthew McSorley, OSB, a professor of English at Belmont Abbey, encouraged Drye to develop his writing skills. At the University of North Carolina, Drye studied under Pulitzer Prize-winning journalist Philip Meyer, and later became a close friend of the late Jim Shumaker, a journalist and instructor at the School of Journalism. These two instructors greatly influenced Drye's later work. Drye also was encouraged to pursue a career in journalism by Mark MacDonald, who was city editor of The Chapel Hill News at the time. He earned a bachelor's degree in English from UNC in 1981

Drye worked as a reporter and later as managing editor for The News of Orange County in Hillsborough, North Carolina; the Macon (Georgia) Telegraph; the News and Observer of Raleigh, North Carolina; and the Stuart (Florida) News. Drye was working as a reporter in South Florida when Hurricane Andrew made landfall near Miami in August 1992 and was fascinated by the power of the storm. He then began to intensively research hurricanes.

Drye's research on hurricanes eventually led him to the Labor Day hurricane of 1935, which became the topic of his first book. Drye married Jane E. Morrow, PhD, in Wilmington, North Carolina in 1992. 

In 1995, Drye wrote a letter to Mickey Mantle when he learned that his childhood hero was dying of cancer. Drye's heartfelt letter—one of tens of thousands the former baseball superstar received before his death in August 1995—was chosen for Letters to Mickey, a collection of 109 letters from Mantle's fans written to him after his battle with cancer was publicly announced. The book was published by HarperCollins in 1995. Drye later became a contributing writer for FoxSportsBiz.com, a website produced by Fox News that focused on the business side of college and professional sports.

Drye currently produces a blog, Drye Goods, an eclectic collection of essays about topics of personal interest such as baseball and other sports, the Civil War, hurricanes, popular culture, and other topics. He lives with his wife in Wilmington, North Carolina.

Books
Drye's first book, Storm of the Century: The Labor Day Hurricane of 1935, was published by National Geographic Books in August 2002. The book, a work of narrative nonfiction, tells the story of the most powerful hurricane in US history, which struck the Upper Florida Keys on September 2, 1935, during the depths of the Great Depression. The storm's 200 mph winds and 20-foot storm surge killed more than 400, including about 260 World War I veterans working on a New Deal construction project building a highway between Miami and Key West. A political storm followed the hurricane when WPA administrators were blamed for not getting the veterans off the low-lying islands before the storm struck.

Storm of the Century was well received by reviewers, who praised Drye's description of the Keys in the early 20th century and his dramatic yet meticulously accurate portrayal of the storm's power. (See Kirkus Reviews, Publishers Weekly, Orlando Sentinel)

Shortly after the book's publication, Drye began writing about hurricanes and other topics for National Geographic News.
In 2005, Drye was invited to write an in-depth article about the Labor Day Hurricane of 1935 for Tequesta, the scholarly journal of the Historical Association of Southern Florida. The journal is considered an authoritative source for the study of the history of South Florida.

That same year, Storm of the Century: The Labor Day Hurricane of 1935 was the basis for a two-hour (with commercials) documentary film, “Nature’s Fury: Storm of the Century” produced for the History Channel by Towers Productions of Chicago. Drye is the primary narrator in the film, which premiered in 2006.

In August 2005, Drye launched National Geographics extensive coverage of Hurricane Katrina with a series of stories for National Geographic News that examined the storm's immediate effects. In the aftermath of Katrina, Drye was asked to write about Katrina's unprecedented devastation and the political fallout in the wake of that hurricane for The Washington Post and the History News Network. 

In 2006, Drye was hired by Key West Magazine to write a package of stories about how Key West and the Florida Keys likely would be affected by a major hurricane. Those stories won a first place Charlie Award for Public Service from the Florida Magazine Association in 2007. That same year, Drye was recognized for his work by the General Alumni Association of the University of North Carolina.

Drye was a consultant for author Jennifer Holm when she was writing Turtle in Paradise, a children's novel set in the Labor Day hurricane of 1935. After the book was published in 2010, it became a Newbery Honor Book and won the Golden Kite Award.

Drye's second book, Images of America: Plymouth and Washington County, was published by Arcadia Publishing in 2014. The book tells the story, in pictures, of a region in northeastern North Carolina whose history dates back to the earliest days of American history.

His third book, For Sale—American Paradise: How Our Nation Was Sold an Impossible Dream in Florida, was published by Lyons Press in 2015  and tells the story of the colorful, tragicomic Florida Land Boom of the 1920s. The book was praised by reviewers, including Publishers Weekly, Library Journal, Booklist, The Florida Times-Union, and others. In 2016, the book won a Silver Medal for Best Nonfiction- Southeast Region, from the Independent Publisher Book Awards (also known as the IPPY Awards)

Recognition
1993: Scripps Howard award for reporting, Stuart News, Stuart, Florida
1995: Scripps Howard award for reporting, Stuart News, Stuart, Florida
 August 2002: Storm of the Century: The Labor Day Hurricane of 1935, published by National Geographic
2006: A documentary film, “Nature’s Fury: Storm of the Century,” based on Drye's first book, premiered on the History Channel, with Drye appearing as the film's lead narrator. The film was produced by Towers Productions of Chicago.  
2007: Charles S. Roberts (informally, Charlie Award) for Public Service, first place, from Florida Magazine Association
2014: Images of America: Plymouth and Washington County, published by Arcadia Publishing
2015: For Sale—American Paradise: How Our Nation Was Sold an Impossible Dream in Florida published by Lyons Press
2015: Files and documents compiled for Storm of the Century added to collection of Florida Keys History and Discovery Center in Islamorada, Florida. An exhibit about Drye's work is planned for display in the museum.
2016: Silver Medal for Best Nonfiction, Southeast Region, for For Sale—American Paradise, from the Independent Publisher Book Awards (also known as an IPPY Award)
2016: Included on the North Carolina Literary Map for New Hanover, Orange, Stanly and Washington counties

References 

1949 births
Living people
21st-century American journalists
20th-century American journalists
American male journalists
People from Albemarle, North Carolina
Belmont Abbey College alumni
University of North Carolina alumni